The 1978 Island Holidays Classic, also known as the Hawaii Open, was a men's tennis tournament played an outdoor hard courts in Maui, Hawaii, in the United States that was part of the 1978 Colgate-Palmolive Grand Prix circuit. It was the fifth edition of the tournament and was held from October 2 through October 8, 1978. Unseeded Bill Scanlon won the singles title.

Finals

Singles
 Bill Scanlon defeated  Peter Fleming 6–2, 6–0
 It was Scanlon's first singles title of his career.

Doubles
 Tom Gullikson /  Tim Gullikson defeated  Peter Fleming /  John McEnroe 7–6, 7–6

References

Island Holidays Classic
Island Holidays Classic
Island Holidays Classic
Island Holidays Classic
Hawaii Open